Theodosius Kaskamanidis (September 24, 1971 – November 11, 2016), better known as Saki Kaskas or "Captain Ginger", was a Greek-Canadian video game music composer, best known for his soundtracks in the Need for Speed series.

Biography
Saki was born in Krefeld, West Germany, in 1971, to Greek parents. Shortly after he was born, the whole family moved to Vancouver, British Columbia, Canada. Saki started to play the guitar when he was 15. He practiced 5 hours a day and in two years he was in his first band, Omnibol. They were a rock band and they gained some notoriety around the Vancouver music scene.

In 1993, Omnibol broke up. At that time, he started to play in various bands. Saki played in a Greek folk band, a heavy metal band, a cover band, a ‘power trio’ rock band and in a guitar duet. He also played sessions for commercials and such.

Electronic Arts
In 1994, Saki joined The Heavy Lounge. This was an instrumental band and they played progressive rock with some leanings towards Jazz, Funk and Metal. The keyboard player was Jeff van Dyck, who was working for Electronic Arts at the time. In 1996, Jeff got Saki a contract for The Need for Speed. Soon after that, Saki became a full-time composer for EA, and he composed music for NHL 97, NHL 98, Need for Speed II, Need for Speed III: Hot Pursuit, Need for Speed: High Stakes, Need for Speed: Porsche Unleashed, Rugby 2001, Missile Command, and Mass Effect 2.

Other projects
Together with The Humble Brothers, Saki Kaskas has done session guitar work for remixes for Skinny Puppy, Deftones, Linkin Park, Filter, Dry Cell, Anastacia and Static-X.

In 2012, Saki Kaskas began to record again, composing music on his own behalf, and for newer games such as Sleeping Dogs.

Death
Kaskas died of a fentanyl overdose on November 11, 2016, in his Vancouver apartment; he had been battling heroin addiction for over a decade. A posthumous album he was working on at the time of his death, Theodosius, was released in 2019. It was completed by his friend and former Electronic Arts colleague Jeff Van Dyck, with the help of other former colleagues like Traz Damji and Rom Di Prisco.

Prominent works
The Need for Speed
Need for Speed II
Need for Speed III: Hot Pursuit
Need for Speed: High Stakes
NHL 97
NHL 98
Missile Command
Need for Speed: Porsche Unleashed
Rugby 2001
SimCity 4
Mass Effect 2

Interview
EXCLUSIVE interview with Saki Kaskas for Romulus Club - 2014-02-12

References

1971 births
2016 deaths
Greek composers
Male composers
People from Krefeld
Video game composers